Yannick Dias Pupo (born 17 June 1988 in São Paulo) is a Brazilian footballer. He is a free agent since he was released in January 2010 by Marília.

Signed by Sporting at age 18 in summer 2006, he was loaned back to Brazil for Juventude on 31 August 2007. He was loaned to Palmeiras on 1 March 2008, for their Campeonato Paulista.

External links
 CBF

1988 births
Living people
Brazilian footballers
Brazilian expatriate footballers
Sporting CP footballers
Association football midfielders
Footballers from São Paulo